Cuspidaria elegans is a species of bivalves in the family Cuspidariidae. It is reported in Indonesia, the Philippines, the South China Sea (the Xisha Islands), Taiwan and the Beibu Gulf. Its Chinese common name is 华美杓蛤, which translates as "colorful scoop clam".

References 

Cuspidariidae
Bivalves described in 1843
Fauna of China